Euphydryas is a genus of Nymphalidae butterflies.

Species

References

Further reading
 Glassberg, Jeffrey Butterflies through Binoculars: The West (2001)
 Guppy, Crispin S. and Shepard, Jon H. Butterflies of British Columbia (2001)
 James, David G. and Nunnallee, David Life Histories of Cascadia Butterflies (2011)
 Pelham, Jonathan Catalogue of the Butterflies of the United States and Canada (2008)
 Pyle, Robert Michael The Butterflies of Cascadia (2002)

External links
 Butterflies and Moths of North America
 Butterflies of America

 
Melitaeini
Butterflies of North America
Butterfly genera
Taxa named by Samuel Hubbard Scudder